A vert ramp is a form of half-pipe used in extreme sports such as vert skating, vert skateboarding and vert BMX.

Vert ramps are so named because they transition from a horizontal plane (known as the flat-bottom) to a vertical section on top.

This vertical section makes it easier for the riders to take off and 'catch air' on a vert ramp rather than on a half-pipe.  
This is because the vert at the top causes the rider to naturally go straight up into the air instead of forward and off the ramp 
(as is the tendency on half-pipes that don't go vertically upwards).

See also
Half pipe
Mega ramp
Quarter pipe
Vert skating
Skateboard
BMX

External links
Technical drawing of a vert ramp (in Czech)

Skateboarding equipment
Inline skating
Roller skating
Vert skating